OSU, Osu, or osu can stand for:

Universities
 Ohio State University, Columbus, Ohio
 Oklahoma State University–Stillwater in Stillwater, Oklahoma.
 Oregon State University in Corvallis, Oregon

Places
 Osu, Accra, a district in Ghana
 Osu Castle
 OSU is the IATA airport code for Ohio State University Airport
 Ōsu, a district of Nagoya, Japan

Video games
 Osu! Tatakae! Ouendan (series), a series of three rhythm video games for the Nintendo DS console released from 2005 to 2007
 Osu! Tatakae! Ouendan, a 2005 rhythm game for the Nintendo DS
 Moero! Nekketsu Rhythm Damashii Osu! Tatakae! Ouendan 2, the game's 2007 sequel
 osu!, a series of games first released in 2007 which is inspired by Osu! Tatakae! Ouendan, originally for Windows and ported to other systems

Other uses

 Old Salt Union, a newgrass band from Illinois
 Operation Straight Up, an evangelical organization that provided Christian-themed entertainment to the United States military
 Order of St. Ursula, a branch of Ursulines (Roman Catholic Christian religious order)
 Osu caste system, a caste system practiced by the Igbo people in West Africa
 Ottawa South United, a Canadian soccer team

See also
 Ozu (disambiguation)